DEP domain containing 1 is a protein in humans that is encoded by the DEPDC1 gene.

References

External links 
 PDBe-KB provides an overview of all the structure information available in the PDB for Human DEP domain-containing protein 1A (DEPDC1)

Further reading 

Genes on human chromosome 1